Civil discourse is the engagement in discourse (conversation) intended to enhance understanding; Civil discourse exists as a function of freedom of speech. It is discourse that "supports, rather than undermines the societal good." An example of civil discourse was the "robust, honest, frank and constructive dialogue and deliberation that seeks to advance the public interest" by an assortment of national leaders in 2011 during a conversation at the U.S. Supreme Court. In contrast, uncivil discourse is "language characterized as containing direct insults, willful misattribution of motive without due reason, and open contempt."

The definition of civil, in civil discourse, can have two distinct meanings, according to professor of public policy Archon Fung: 

The definition of discourse is a verbal exchange of "thoughts and ideas, especially in a formal manner." Dictionary.com defines discourse as a formal discussion of a subject in speech or writing, as a dissertation, treatise, sermon, etc.

Civil Discourse is

 Truthful
 Productive
 Audience-based
 About listening and talking
 Each Speaker's own responsibility

Civil Discourse is not

 Mere politeness
 An exercise in martyrdom
 About telling other people who they are
 Purely performative

History

In Book III of An Essay Concerning Human Understanding (1690), philosopher John Locke contrasts between civil and philosophical discourse (or rhetorical discourse) with the former being for the benefit of the reader, and the public good:

Philosopher Marshall McLuhan explores channels by which civil discourse may be engaged with in his book Understanding Media: The Extensions of Man (1964). The title of this chapter, The Medium is the Message has become a term in communication theory. This exploration is widely understood to be a great predictor of the internet today, and how discourse on the internet works. The main idea of this work is that those channels by which we communicate discourse on are just as important as the content of the discourse itself. 

In 2001, social psychologist Kenneth J. Gergen described civil discourse as the "language of dispassionate objectivity", and suggested that it requires respect of the other participants, such as the reader. It neither diminishes the others' moral worth, nor questions their good judgment; it avoids hostility, direct antagonism, or excessive persuasion; it requires modesty and an appreciation for the other participant's experiences.

A 2011 assessment of civil discourse from Bob Stein, quoted in an article by Maria Bustillos, echoed Locke's statements, and highlighted civil discourse's usefulness in the Internet age: "'The truth of a discipline, idea or episode in history lies in these interstices,' he said. 'If you want to understand something complicated it's helpful to look at the back and forth of competing voices or views.'"

The Charles Koch Institute stated in 2018 that "Democracy presupposes that citizens are deeply engaged in the debates of our public life, and that good outcomes are reached by the airing of all arguments on the policy questions of the day, with the presumption that the most persuasive and well-reasoned will earn the support of a majority of voters."

According to American University's Project on Civil Discourse in 2018, civil discourse is not purely performative or mere politeness; instead, it is truthful and productive. It is each speaker's own responsibility to engage in civil discourse. Civil discourse is not an exercise in martyrdom or telling other people who they are; civil discourse is audience-based and about both listening and talking.

Civility generally involves behaviors such as looking for areas of agreement as a jumping off point for discussions about differences, listening beyond one's biases, and encouraging others to do the same, said nursing educators Emily Gamm and Amy J. Barton in 2022.

Importance 
Civil discourse embodies the values of civic learning: patience, open-mindedness, compromise, and mutual respect.  Civil discourse is the practice of engaging in conversation to seek and foster understanding with mutual airing of views. It is not a contest; rather, it is intended to promote mutual understanding. It involves all parties’ commitment to respect for truth, a practice of active listening and purposeful speaking, and an understanding that the cultivation of civil discourse is not a right but a responsibility. When properly executed, those involved can communicate alternative views, opinions, ideas, or facts without causing emotional distress or an altercation between individuals. Participants in civil discourse must learn about all sides of the issue at hand by respectfully listening to alternative interpretations, critically weighing the information's veracity, analyzing what they've heard, and being willing to alter their positions based on a convincing argument and evidence. As individuals, civil discourse enables us to preserve our relationships with our friends, families, and neighbors, ensuring that we have robust ties across points of difference.

Additionally, trademarks of civil discourse like empathy and discernment should be included in daily life practices in a way that helps the development of discipline, content knowledge, general debate skills, analytical and critical thinking, and more. In all contexts, but particularly in educational settings, engagement in civic discourse is crucial. The voices, histories, and experiences of individuals who have been oppressed and who are still subject to injustice should be taught in schools and communities. As a society, we must educate the next generation on how to recognize injustices and challenge them when they arise. Without understanding how other people experience bias, we won't be able to assist one another or make changes for a more accepting and hopeful future. 

People can be more democratic and cherish freedom of speech when a society as a whole upholds these civic learning values.  As a result, there can be a better exchange of ideas without bias or discrimination. Because it allows for everyone to engage in healthy engagement, a healthy civil discourse among the community is crucial for society. Furthermore, with civil disclosure, even the minority's voice is heard because it is this group in society that the more powerful groups in society are most prone to silence. Stereotypes can be avoided and eliminated through civil discourse, which also promotes cross-cultural interaction because of prejudice.  In her book Epistemic Injustice: Power and the Ethics of Knowing, Miranda Fricker has stated that "If stereotypes are widely held associations between a group and an attribute, then stereotyping entails a cognitive commitment to some empirical generalization about a given social group ('women are intuitive'). A generalization can of course be more or less strong. Accordingly, in extreme cases someone who stereotypes might be committed to the generalization as a universal ('all women are intuitive'); or, at the other end of the spectrum, one might be committed to it in a very dilute form ('many women are intuitive'); or, again, one might be committed to something in between ('most women are intuitive')."

The exchange of ideas through civil discourse is essential for a democratic society to function, as democracy assumes the participation and engagement of the public in airing their views and opinions, and that progress and development of the society are ensured when the most persuasive and debated ideas earn the support of the majority. This also plays into minorities voicing their opinions and being discussed by the general public.  This is where the aforementioned civic values of open-mindedness and compromise are practiced, according to the Charles Koch Institute. People engage in an online discussion to connect, express their views, and hear from others. A prerequisite to creating an online space that promotes civil discourse is understanding why people currently seek these spaces.  Perceptions and motivations for online engagement differ across users. 

In On Liberty, John Stuart Mill argues in favor of free speech; one of his foundational points is that in order to determine whether an idea is true, or contains some truth, the idea must be able to be freely heard and discussed. Mill argues that free thought and speech are important for the acquisition of true beliefs and for individual growth and development. In short, Mill's argument hinges on the idea that determination of truth among ideas by civil discourse is necessary for moving society forward, and that free speech is necessary for the mechanism of civil discourse to properly function.

Philosopher Miranda Fricker argues that to handle discussions of topics often associated with civil discourse we should frame the discourse as first-order ethical questions focused on socially situated conception. This is meant to cause civil discourse to focus on the social aspects of the situation and those participating in the conversation, by focusing on questions of power structure with first-order ethical questions while also acknowledging the multiple aspects of social situations and their impact. It is the duty of the persons involved in the discourse to be mindful of their position as both a listener and a speaker and acknowledge issues with power structure should they arise.

Civil discourse opens wider possibilities, deepens one's knowledge, adds another layer of authority to the works, helps inspire others, and is the first step to making them a reality.  According to the Journal of Higher Education Outreach and Engagement, polite civil discourse can improve comprehension of a subject, which can foster both academic and personal progress.

In the Information Age 

For centuries, issues of civil discourse only arose concerning written and oral communication. But in the Information Age, social media and online information and communications technology have dramatically expanded the potential for human interaction. These new tools make up, according to philosopher Marshall McLuhan, the first significant shift in human communication since the printing press. Where the printing press enabled "the ownership of an idea," the Digital Revolution led to the devaluation of the expert and the empowering of collaboration. Thus, knowledge in the Information Age is defined by crowdsourcing and argument.

Yet social media and online information and communications technology generate significant challenges for institutional policies and practices to encourage and sustain civil discourse for critical social and personal issues. Journalist Alexander Heffner of PBS's The Open Mind has expressed concerns about "increasing divisiveness in American discourse" and has lectured on "Civil Discourse in an Uncivil Age". The National Institute for Civil Discourse have cited criticisms that uncivil interactions are common in text-based online communication. In his book The Cult of the Amateur: How Today's Internet Is Killing Our Culture, Andrew Keen argues that the democratization of the internet "is not improving community; it is not developing rich conversations; and it is not building collaboration" but rather has led to the development of "digital narcissism", or the embrace of the self, which is counterproductive to citizenship. By focusing on oneself, one is not listening, reading, and ingesting high quality information which are key elements to citizenship. Keen also argues that the anonymity that the internet affords leads to uncivil conversations online.

With that said, online anonymity does lend its own set of benefits to civil discourse. That mainly being that individuals who may face discrimination from their immediate community should they openly take a certain stance find it possible to join the conversation through online anonymity. By conducting their narrative in such a manner, the aforementioned individual may find it possible to connect with others in similar situations and promote beneficial change within their community.

Reynol Junco and Arthur Chickering mention in their Civil Discourse in the Age of Social Media that there are many challenges to discourse online, such as cyber-bullying. Academic institutions should be focusing on responsible social media discourse as communication trends towards increasing amounts of digital communication. They outline eight guidelines for academia to follow when teaching appropriate civil discourse through technology: "(1) make a formal institutional commitment to supporting institutional pluralism; (2) recognize the educational value of open sharing and examination of diverse views; (3) recognize that online forms of expression are as important to student development as traditional oral and written expressions; (4) emphasize the importance of respect and civility; (5) emphasize the critical need for valid information, solid evidence and explicit information about sources; (6) spell out expected positive behaviors and sanctions for negative actions; (7) requires that personal identification be part of all communications and interactions; and (8) designate a clear locus of responsibility for monitoring online communications and interactions and for the strengthening of the educational uses of these emerging communication and technologies."

While technologies are conducive to public discourse, they can also allow for discourse that is uncivil and detrimental. One example of how the pursuit of civil discourse is impacted by new technologies was conducted by Stanford University. Stanford researches used artificial intelligence to develop a chatbot moderator to promote civil, civic discourse on its online deliberation platform. Furthermore, technologies made available in the age of information, such as artificial intelligence and machine learning, have been deployed in initiatives to improve civil discourse in areas such as politics. The Civil Discourse Project, a non-partisan group developing software that rates political leaders on civility, combines crowdsourcing and artificial intelligence to flag divisive language amongst political candidates.

It is important for people to have the ability to exchange ideas. "On every continent, through countless experiments and projects, teachers, social activists, researchers, community organizers, and concerned technologists are writing their own rules. These people are working to establish an information and communication infrastructure that is in marked contrast to that desired by the dot-coms and the technolibertarians—-an infrastructure that truly meets the disparate and critical needs of the world's citizenry." People engaging in civil discourse are intellectually honest with each other. If someone else makes a good point, they acknowledge it. If someone else asks a tough question (as long as it's relevant to the discussion), they do their best to answer it, not avoid it.

As free exchange of ideas lays at the forefront of the defining necessities for civil discourse, online platforms must allow for a digital marketplace of ideas. Yet online social media and discussion formats may not always provide effective means for civil discourse, as research suggests that it is much easier to be dismissive of opposing or new ideas in an online format of discourse as opposed to traditional face-to-face methods. Online platforms propagate discourse of all formats as sharing is the nature of the internet, yet maintaining the civil nature of such discussion becomes increasingly difficult in the digital sphere. "Just as reasoning supports an assertion, evidence supports reasoning. There are many different kinds of evidence, ranging from expert testimony or statistics to historical or con-temporary examples." A lack of these fundamental reasoning skills can worsen an already anonymous and detached argument. We see a decline in the civil nature of discussing ideas and reach more personal volatile fallacies.

 Unlike social media, Wikipedia is a platform that invites a civil discourse by allowing contributions from the public on just about any topic in a civil manner. Complete with guidelines and monitored, participants are allowed to contribute multiple contrasting viewpoints, elaborate, add, and include links and citations with more information in the spirit of sharing resources. Participants also have access to the history of the contributions allowing for a deeper and more complex understanding of the subject.“Wikipedia has a remarkable record of bringing confronting opinions into the same conversation without it descending into hate speech and loutish behavior. Participation may be cheap to assemble online, but it works better at Wikipedia because the site has a widely publicized set of norms and principles, which editors attempt to enforce within a framework that assumes goodwill.” 

Neutral information can help viewers grasp other viewpoints and the underlying mechanisms, which can inspire people to engage in healthy civic conversation. Web search engine algorithms promote the news "filter bubble" because they present personalized results of polarized topics such that the top results are biased towards a user's existing beliefs. A 2018 study from Northeastern University showed that Google search engine results about Donald Trump following the 2016 inauguration were significantly more biased when a user was logged into their Google account (and therefore provided personal information about the user's existing beliefs) than non-personalized search results. Consequently, search engines can influence political opinion and even election outcomes. This bias in search engine and social media algorithms can hinder civil discourse because civil discourse is fundamentally about understanding multiple perspectives, and a person cannot attempt to understand an opposing idea if they are never exposed to it. With the limitations caused by search engine algorithms, people have the potential to become more polarized and divisive, and unable or unwilling to engage in civil discourse. The order in which search engine results are presented is highly influential, because the top three results receive over 50% of clicks, and results on the first results page receive 75% of clicks. 

Furthermore, people generally have a high level of trust in Google and other search engines and are often unaware they are receiving biased search results, making personalized results through search engine optimization especially impactful on civil discourse with effects that are not be readily apparent. Additionally, 62% of adults get news through social media; however, only 18% of adults say they do so often. Many Facebook news sources are biased across six different metrics: political affiliation, age, gender, income level, racial affinity, and national identity. While political affiliation is the most apparent, bias is quantifiable across the other metrics as well. Twitter news search results were found to be biased based on input data and ranking system. The results, however, were not found to become increasingly polarized, but were found to be biased contingent on the query keywords and time of day the search happened. Additionally, the Twitter news search results were found to be less favorable towards political candidates than those found in an equivalent Google search, as the Google top results often contain candidate controlled web pages.

National Institute for Civil Discourse 
To reach a broader audience, the University of Arizona created The National Institute for Civil Discourse (NICD) in 2011. The NICD is a non-partisan organization based out of Tucson, Arizona, that believes in the power of civil discourse to transcend party divides. Their key principles include constructively engaging differences, listening for understanding, empathy, humility, conscience, principled advocacy, and common ground. The founding chairmen are former U.S. presidents George H.W. Bush and Bill Clinton, with board members such as Madeleine Albright, Katie Couric, and former U.S. Congresswoman Gabrielle Giffords. 

The NICD receives grants and funding for a number of research projects to advance the theory, understanding, and practical application of civil discourse. Their focus is primarily in politics as a response to the growing divide in the United States' political arena, yet their research supports a broad application. NICD research projects include "The Concept of Civility in Modern Political Philosophy", "Civility in State Legislatures, Political Polarization", "The Role of Rhetoric and Emotions in Civil Discourse", "A Crisis of Civility? Political Discourse and its Discontents", and multiple projects that focus on civil discourse and conduct during United States presidential and Senate debates.

Rules of civil discourse 
In order to have a successful civil discourse, there are some guidelines that each participant should follow. First, participants have to remain respectful and calm even when confronted to ideas or views that they disagree with. To make a point or defend a position in a civil discussion, you would employ logic, persuasion, proof, knowledge, and reasoning, but you would not personally attack the opposing party. It is important to separate egos and ideas, a lot of individuals feel threatened when their ideas are challenged which impacts the discourse. Keeping a logical frame is very valuable in these situations. As mentioned by the Administrative Office of the U.S. Courts, separating facts and opinions will result in a more constructive discussion, while both are valid they have to be expressed appropriately.

Proponents of civil discourse have proposed loosely defined "rules" to be followed. Andrea Leskes, writing in Liberal Education in 2013, gave a list of such rules, such as listening thoughtfully to what others say, seeking to understand the sources of disagreement and common ground, coming into the discussion willing to compromise, using verified information to support one's argument, and refraining from violence. However, as noted by Kirby Jarod, at times it is impossible to remain stoic during such debates as our responses are largely emotion based. Such responses can lead to divides and further conflict among parties rather than any form of resolution. Therefore, scholars have asserted the idea that empathy plays a critical role in civil discourse as it allows for interpersonal relationships to be established.

Some common guidelines to facilitate civil discourse summarized by the University of Michigan include identifying a clear purpose, establishing ground rules, providing a common basis for understanding, creating a framework for discussion that maintains focus and flow, including everyone, and summarizing discussion and gathering feedback.

Establishing rules of civil discourse in the classroom allows for free exchange of ideas and opportunities to learn for students of all ages. There are multiple ways of establishing rules to aid in creating a space for safe and civil discourse. Assigning differing perspectives, lenses, or analytical roles to students was found to expand discussion to focusing the debate on defending with evidence as opposed to opinion. Additionally, adopting a debate style of teaching by asking students to defend multiple sides of the same issue allowed for empathy and understanding in discussing differing opinions of other students. Requiring students to use a three part framework for argument, Assertion, Reasoning, and Evidence (ARE) teaches students to engage in arguments using the content and quality of the reasoning and evidence. Teaching a four-step process for refutation also allows for the students to substantiate their arguments: Restate, Refute, Support, and Conclude. Following this pattern helps teach the ability to resolve opposing ideas and to approach disagreements logically.

Civil Discourse cannot happen on its own in the classroom. A teacher must decide to teach the skills and responsibilities of civil discourse in the classroom, and should monitor the process to ensure that it is succeeding. It is one thing for students to avoid launching personal attacks during a debate, but it can still be hard not to take some things personally. Even adults struggle with certain topics. Sometimes, we think the class is conducting a civil discourse, and not launching inappropriate personal attacks, but a student in the class might still react as though they had. This is why it’s important to monitor the classroom climate for signs that things are becoming heated. A certain student in the class may not be ready for a particular topic. Each student has his or her own developmental readiness level and there are some “hot” topics that are risky even with the most mature students. Some students might have personal backgrounds that make certain topics very uncomfortable for them. The goal of teachers is to provide appropriate challenges with appropriate levels of support. We want to encourage strength in our students, but we can balance this with reasonable levels of sensitivity towards individualized concerns. That being said, there is a current trend toward excessive hypersensitivity in academia that is currently squelching open discourse. Generally speaking, it is a bad rule for the most hypersensitive student in a class to be deciding what can and cannot be discussed by everyone else. In some cases, students have been known to falsely claim offense over very trivial issues for attention seeking purposes. If teachers are dealing with a very sensitive class, it is reasonable to stick to discussion topics available on the Public Debate Forum website and to encourage anyone repeatedly claiming offense at trivial issues to seek additional outside support, such as personal counseling.

The U.S. federal judiciary has compiled information on creating ground rules for civil discourse, including how to interact respectfully with someone who has broken the rules of civility that were agreed upon. As Judge Robin Rosenberg of the U.S. District Court, West Palm Beach, Florida says, "Civility is a way of communicating with one another, it is the foundation by which we relate to one another, and from that, everything else flows."

According to the Institute for Civility in Government, "Civility is about more than just politeness, although politeness is a necessary first step. Being polite means trying to smooth over potentially points of conflict, facilitating life in our social world. It is about disagreeing without disrespect, seeking common ground as a starting point for dialogue about differences, listening past one's preconceptions, and teaching others to do the same. Civility is the hard work of staying present even with those with whom we have deep-rooted and fierce disagreements. It is political in the sense that it is a necessary prerequisite for civic action. But it is political, too, in the sense that it is about negotiating interpersonal power such that everyone's voice is heard, and nobody's is ignored."

Challenges to civil discourse 
In order for civil discourse to take place, participants must be on equal ground. There are many articles explaining that this topic may not be as straightforward as giving each person the floor. In her introduction to Epistemic Injustice, Miranda Fricker identifies two lenses through which culture may be viewed as unjust: testimonial injustice, the prejudice of the listener which causes them to give a deflated level of credibility to the speaker's word, and hermeneutical injustice, a gap in the collective experience that puts someone at an unfair disadvantage when it comes to making sense of their social experience. These two forms of injustice may alter the outcome of discourse due to the unequal view of credibility of players. More specifically, Fricker theorizes them as a wrong done to someone specifically in their capacity as a knower. Fricker states, "Eradicating these injustices would ultimately take not just more virtuous hearers, but collective social political change-in matters of epistemic injustice, the ethical is political." An example of testimonial injustice is when a person is dismissed or not heard because of their gender, race, accent or other difference. An example of hermeneutical injustice is a woman who has been sexually harassed in a culture where this behavior would be dismissed. For instance, suppose a woman works in a work environment where a sexual harassment is perceived as a form of 'flirting', and a rejection of it would be commonly perceived as a 'lack of sense of humor'. In this context, when a woman is sexually harassed, she will have difficulty of finding the appropriate words to communicate the case to others because she lacks the concept of sexual harassment of the workplace.

Regarding the above definition of civil discourse, one challenge is that what constitutes an “insult” is socially defined and often not shared among different cultural groups; members of some groups may perceive another group’s speech as an insult or attack, while that speech does not communicate harm within the second group’s culture or linguistic patterns.  What an “insult” is needs to be defined more rigorously, to avoid intercultural misunderstanding and tone policing which may stem from a group’s lack of awareness of another group or from one group’s (intentional or otherwise) efforts to undermine a perspective not held by the majority.

Similarly, the condition of “without due reason” in the above definition - “willful misattribution of motive without due reason” - needs to be further defined to answer the question: who determines what is “due reason”?  There are many reasons why someone might perceive a lack of due reason, including lack of cultural awareness or lack of shared lived experience; leaving this undefined or loosely defined runs the risk of silencing those from underrepresented and marginalised communities, which is particularly harmful when the party making that determination has more power (social or structural) in an interaction.

Additionally, the definition of civil discourse requiring avoiding “open contempt” may also disproportionately harm members of marginalised communities by undermining or distracting from the legitimacy of expressions of rage.  As philosopher Herbert Marcuse writes, “[I]f a newscaster reports the torture and murder of civil rights workers in the same unemotional tone he uses to describe the stock-market or the weather, or with the same great emotion with which he says his commercials, then such objectivity is spurious- more, it offends against humanity and truth by being calm where one should be enraged, by refraining from accusation where accusation is in the facts themselves. The tolerance expressed in such impartiality serves to minimize or even absolve prevailing intolerance and suppression.”If the goal of civil discourse is to enhance understanding, then quieting or dismissing the truth in messages from historically underrepresented or harmed communities because they make visible “contempt” misses the aim of improving understanding - an interaction which has the consequence of reinforcing pre-existing systems of oppression, including communicative and informational oppression, whether intentional or otherwise.

Furthermore, the implementation of fallacious arguments can all too easily invalidate the efforts of one party to make their case. James L. Gibson notes that throughout history the utilization of ad hominem arguments to disparage an opponent's character often delegitimizes their defense. Leaving the aggressor as the de facto victor as it then becomes unnecessary for them to refute any previous points made. In such exchanges very little benefit can be derived as the conversation is never able to evolve and more often than not the aggressor's party seeks only to serve their own ends. 

In On Liberty, John Stuart Mill argues that the truth will emerge only in an environment of free expression. Thomas Jefferson makes a similar argument in Virginia's Bill for Establishing Religious Freedom, a precursor to the First Amendment to the United States Constitution, where he said, "Truth is great and will prevail if left to herself. She is the proper and sufficient antagonist to error, and has nothing to fear from the conflict, unless, by human interposition, disarmed of her natural weapons, free argument and debate; errors ceasing to be dangerous when it is permitted freely to contradict them." As media analysts like Brooke Gladstone of On the Media have pointed out, no law of nature provides for the triumph of reason. History and the internet are proof that this belief is itself an untruth. She writes in The Trouble with Reality: A Rumination on Moral Panic in Our Time (2017), "Part of the problem stems from the fact that facts, even a lot of facts, do not constitute reality. Reality is what forms after we filter, arrange, and prioritize those facts and marinate them in our values and traditions. Reality is personal." Gladstone argues that most individuals will not seek for truth in a sea of information with varying levels of truthfulness and are more likely to agree with opinions that agree with their existing worldview—a tendency referred to as confirmation bias. In addition, people and organizations may now, as they have in the past, simply invent new reasoning for actions that previously would have been considered wrong or unethical. Psychologist Johnathan Haidt argues that reasoning is more effective as a way to justify actions than navigating to truth. He writes, "If you think that moral reasoning is something we do to figure out the truth, you'll be constantly frustrated by how foolish, biased, and illogical people become when they disagree with you. But if you think about moral reasoning as a skill we humans evolved to further our social agendas—to justify our own actions and to defend the teams we belong to—then things will make a lot more sense."

Money as speech has further complicated this matter. People like Mill and Jefferson expected honest disagreement among people with a similar reach. They had no way to foresee that big business would know the truth, pay scientists to lie about it, and create civic organizations and think tanks for the purpose of spreading the lie. Jürgen Habermas stated that discourse stands "with two assumptions: (a) that normative claims to validity have cognitive meaning and can be treated like claims to truth and (b) that the justification of Norma and commands requires that a real discourse be carried out." Thus, it does not need to be the entire truth to use a point or argument in a discourse as long as it is treated like the truth.

There is also the ethics of discourse, and who decides that the discourse is civil or uncivil. As everyone sees the world through their own lenses what one may see as a civil discourse another might view as uncivil. In an essay titled "The Ethics of Discourse" by John M. Budd, he states that "As each person listens, that person must keep an open mind to what is said and to weight it according to the process and content requirements." He then goes on to explain that people engaging in civil discourse have an ethical responsibility to put their own bias away and engage with an open mind. This is not just a responsibility but a necessary action that must be met for all parties to agree that the discourse was indeed civil.

Other challenges include the possibility of uncivil behavior leading to censorship. This leads to fear between both sides and attempts to use the government levers to punish those on the other side. This, in turn, could lead to protests, which can be considered insulting and uncivil but is an approach that can gain attention to the cause, according to the Charles Koch Institute.

The paradox of tolerance is also a challenge to civil discourse through the argument that the freedom of expression has limits. According to the paradox of tolerance, tolerating the intolerant will eventually lead to the intolerant destroying tolerance within the society. In other words, tolerance must have limits if a society is to remain truly tolerant and accepting. In many cases, tolerance can be used as an act of oppression against the marginalized within a society. A humane society must have the goal of tolerance, which includes the elimination of violence and the protection of people from cruelty and injustice. In relation to civil discourse, civil arguments about subjects such human rights or injustices could be considered unconstructive under the paradox of tolerance. If the goal is to advance the public interest, even hearing out polite intolerance will eventually result in a less tolerant society.

Civil discourse and Black Lives Matter protests 
Black Lives Matter (BLM) protests shifted civil discourse toward the movement’s agenda, as captured by social media and news reports. BLM protests dramatically amplified the use of terms associated with the BLM agenda throughout the movement’s history. Longitudinal data show that terms denoting the movement’s theoretically distinctive ideas, such as “systemic racism,” receive more attention during waves of protest. These shocks have notable impacts beyond intense, or “viral,” periods of nationwide protest. Together, these findings indicate that BLM has successfully leveraged protest events to engender lasting changes in the ways that Americans discuss racial inequality.

See also

 Argumentation theory
 
 Citizens for Civil Discourse
 Civic virtue
 Deliberative democracy
 Discourse analysis
 Discourse community
 Discourse ethics
 Epistemic injustice
 Epistemic responsibility
 Epistemic virtue
 Etiquette
 Etiquette in technology
 Paradox of tolerance
 
 Rhetoric
 Rogerian argument
 Self-censorship
 Speech code

References

Further reading

External links

 Dogmatism Versus Civil Discourse (2005), The Open Mind talk show with John Sexton (video)
 National Institute for Civil Discourse, The University of Arizona
 An American Return to Civil Discourse, School of Education, Johns Hopkins University

Sociolinguistics
Etiquette